The Teign Bridge is a road bridge over the River Teign near Kingsteignton, Devon carrying the Exeter Road across the river. It has been Grade II listed since 1987.

Description

Teign Bridge is a single span bridge with a wide segmental arch. It is constructed from local grey limestone with granite voussoirs to the arch rings along with granite intrados and copping to the parapets.

History

The current bridge was constructed in 1815 and overseen by James Green who was a County Surveyor.

The footings of earlier cutwaters are said to survive below the current Teign Bridge. Archaeological evidence has been found of a sequence of bridges on this site including traces of a potentially Roman bridge, an approximately 11th century bridge, the medieval 'Red Bridge' and the 'Grey Bridge' from around the 17th century.

References

Bridges in Devon
Teignbridge